The Iu Mien language (or) is the language spoken by the Iu Mien people in China (where they are considered a constituent group of the Yao peoples), Laos, Vietnam, Thailand and, more recently, the United States in diaspora. Like other Mien languages, it is tonal and monosyllabic.

Linguists in China consider the dialect spoken in Changdong, Jinxiu Yao Autonomous County, Guangxi to be the standard. This standard is also spoken by Iu Mien in the West, however, because most are refugees from Laos, their dialect incorporates influences from the Lao and Thai languages.

Iu Mien has 78% lexical similarity with Kim Mun (Lanten), 70% with Biao-Jiao Mien, and 61% with Dzao Min.

Geographic distribution 
In China, it is spoken in the following counties (Mao 2004:302–303). There are 130,000 speakers in Hunan province, and 400,000 speakers in Guangxi, Yunnan, Guangdong, Guizhou and Jiangxi provinces.
Guangxi: Yangshuo, Lingui, Guanyang, Ziyuan, Xing'an, Longsheng, Gongcheng, Yongfu, Luzhai, Lipu, Mengshen, Pingle, Jinxiu, Yishan, Rong'an, Rongshui, Luocheng, Huanjiang, Shanglin, Xincheng, Laibin, Baise, Napo, Lingyun, Tianlin, Cangwu, Hezhou, Fuchuan, Zhaoping, Fangcheng, Shangsi
Guangdong: Yingde, Lechang, Shixing, Qujiang, Renhua, Wengyuan, Ruyuan, Liannan, Lianshan, Yangshan, Yangchun
Yunnan: Hekou, Jinping, Honghe, Mengla, Malipo, Maguan, Gangnan, Funing, Wenshan
Guizhou: Rongjiang, Congjiang, Sandu, Danzhai, Leishan, Zhenfeng, Luodian
Jiangxi: Quannan, Shanggao
Hunan: Jianghua, Yongzhou, Shuangpai, Xintian, Changning, Daoxian, Lanshan, Lingxian, Ningyuan, Jiangyong, Dong'an, Chenzhou, Zixing, Lingwu, Guiyang, Xinning, Yizhang, [[Chengbu, Qiyang, Chenxi; also in Longzha Township (龙渣瑶族乡), Yanling County

In Vietnam, Dao people belonging to the Đại Bản, Tiểu Bản, Quần Chẹt, Ô Gang, Cóc Ngáng, and Cóc Mùn subgroups speak Iu Mien dialects.

Phonology

Consonants 

There are 31 cited consonant phonemes in Iu Mien. A distinguishing feature of Iu Mien consonants is the presence of voiceless nasals and laterals.

 The standard spelling system for Iu Mien does not represent the stop sounds in a way that corresponds to the IPA symbols, but instead uses e.g. This may stem from an attempt to model the Iu Mien spelling system on Pinyin (used to represent Mandarin Chinese), where  and  represent .
 According to Aumann and Chengqian, in a certain Chinese dialect, the postalveolar affricates are instead palatal stops (/cʰ/, /c/, /ɟ/).
 According to Daniel Bruhn, the voiceless nasals are actually sequences  (i.e. a short nasalized /h/ followed by a voiced nasal), while the voiceless lateral is actually a voiceless lateral fricative .
 Bruhn also observed that younger-generation Iu Mien Americans were more likely to substitute the voiceless nasals and voiceless laterals with /h/ and the alveolo-palatal affricates with their corresponding palato-alveolar variants.

Onset 
It appears that all single consonant phonemes except /ʔ/ can occur as the onset.

Coda 
Unlike Hmong, which generally prohibits coda consonants, Iu Mien has seven single consonant phonemes that can take the coda position. These consonants are /m/, /n/, /ŋ/, [p̚], [t̚], [k̚], and /ʔ/.

Vowels 

Furthermore, additional diphthongs and triphthongs can be formed from the aforementioned vowels through /i/- or /u/-on-gliding (having /i/ or /u/ before the vowel).

The only potential exception appears to be when occurring as a syllable final by itself, where it has an extremely restricted distribution, occurring only 
after the (alveolo-)palatal consonants .

Tones 
Iu Mien is a tonal language with six observed tonemes.

In the Iu Mien United Script (the language's most common writing system), tones are not marked with diacritics; rather, a word's tone is indicated by a special marker letter at the end of the word. If a word lacks a marker, then it is to be pronounced with a middle tone.

Grammar 
Iu Mien is an analytic language and lacks inflection. It is also a monosyllabic language, with most of its lexicon consisting of one syllable.

The language follows a SVO word order. Some other syntactic properties include the following:
 Adjectives usually follow nouns.
 Question words like those meaning 'where' generally come at the end of sentences.
 The negative word  (often shortened to ) may occur before verbs to negate them.
 A prevalence of contractions. Some words consist of a contracted syllable followed by an uncontracted second syllable (in IMUS, these syllables are separated by apostrophes).

Writing system 
In the past, the lack of an alphabet caused low rates of literacy amongst the Iu Mien speakers. It had been written with Chinese characters in China; however, this is extremely difficult for Iu Mien speakers from other countries such as Laos and from groups who now live in the West.

In an effort to address this, an Iu Mien Unified Script was created in 1984 using the Latin script, based on an earlier orthography developed in China. Unlike the Vietnamese language, this alphabet does not use any diacritics to distinguish tones or different vowel sounds, and only uses the 26 letters of the ISO basic Latin alphabet. This orthography distinguishes 30 initials, 128 finals, and eight tones. Hyphens are used to link adjectives with the nouns they modify. The alphabet is similar to the RPA used to write the Hmong language and the Hanyu Pinyin transcription scheme used for Chinese.

IMUS spelling-to-sound correspondences

Films 
The following films feature the Iu Mien language:
2003 – Death of a Shaman. Directed by Richard Hall; produced by Fahm Fong Saeyang.
2010 – "Siang-Caaux Mienh". A story of a very irresponsible family man, alcoholic, and drug addict. He likes his bad friends but he doesn’t love his family. But as he starts paying his mistakes, has become a turning point in his life.
2011 – "Mborqv Jaax Ciangv". A moving family friendly movie.

Notes

References 

 
 

 
 
 
 
 
 Dissertations

Further reading

External links 
An Online Blog By Iu Mien Americans
Mienh.net Language
The Iu-Mien Community Online
Mien Kingdom – Community Forum

OLAC resources in and about the Iu Mien language
World Atlas of Language Structures entry
LearnMien.com

Hmong–Mien languages
Languages of China
Languages of Vietnam
Languages of Thailand
Languages of Laos